Erythrolamprus carajasensis is a species of snake in the family Colubridae. The species is found in  Brazil.

References

Erythrolamprus
Reptiles of Brazil
Endemic fauna of Brazil
Reptiles described in 1985